Gérard Binet (born November 11, 1955) is a politician from the Canadian province of Quebec. He was the Liberal Member of Parliament for the riding of Frontenac—Mégantic.

Born in Thetford Mines, Quebec, he was a businessman and draftsman before he was first elected in 2000. He lost to Marc Boulianne in the riding of Mégantic—L'Érable in 2004.

References
 

1955 births
Liberal Party of Canada MPs
Living people
Members of the House of Commons of Canada from Quebec
People from Thetford Mines
21st-century Canadian politicians